The 2008–09 network late night television schedule for the four major English-language commercial broadcast networks in the United States cover the late night hours from September 2008 to August 2009. The schedule is followed by a list per network of returning series, new series, and series canceled after the 2007-08 television season.

Legend

Schedule

Monday-Friday

Note: The Tonight Show with Jay Leno ended its first run on May 29, 2009, with The Tonight Show with Conan O'Brien premiering on June 1, 2009. 
Note: Late Night with Conan O'Brien ended on February 20, 2009, with Late Night with Jimmy Fallon premiering on March 2, 2009.

Saturday

By network

ABC

Returning series
ABC World News Now
America This Morning
Jimmy Kimmel Live!
Nightline

CBS

Returning series
CBS Morning News
Late Show with David Letterman
The Late Late Show with Craig Ferguson
Up to the Minute

Fox

Returning series
MADtv
Talkshow with Spike Feresten

NBC

Returning series
Early Today
Last Call with Carson Daly
Late Night with Conan O'Brien
Poker After Dark
Saturday Night Live
The Tonight Show with Jay Leno

New series
The Tonight Show with Conan O'Brien
Late Night with Jimmy Fallon

References
TV Listings - New York Times TV Listings

United States late night network television schedules
2008 in American television
2009 in American television